Glycerol phosphate may refer to:

 Glycerol 1-phosphate
 Glycerol 2-phosphate
 Glycerol 3-phosphate